The 2020 Ladbrokes UK Open was a darts tournament staged by the Professional Darts Corporation. It was the eighteenth year of the tournament where players compete in a single elimination tournament to be crowned champion. The tournament was held for the seventh time at the Butlin's Resort in Minehead, England, between 6–8 March 2020, and has the nickname, "the FA Cup of darts" as a random draw is staged after each round following the conclusion of the third round until the final.

Nathan Aspinall was the defending champion after defeating Rob Cross 11–5 in the 2019 final. However, he lost 10–8 to Michael van Gerwen in the fourth round.

Michael van Gerwen won the UK Open for the third time, and the first time since 2016 after beating Gerwyn Price 11–9 in the final. It was Van Gerwen's first title since he won the 2019 Players Championship Finals, where he beat the same opponent, by the same scoreline, at the same venue.

It was the first edition of the UK Open to have more than one nine-darter hit. Jonny Clayton hit a nine-darter on Stage Two during his sixth-round match with Chris Dobey, before Michael van Gerwen did the same against Daryl Gurney in the semi-finals.

Prize money
The prize fund remained at £450,000.

Format
There is a slight change in format for this year, with the 16 Challenge Tour qualifiers becoming 8, with 8 spaces for the Development Tour now available.

The 160 participants will enter the competition incrementally, with 64 players entering in the first round, with match winners joining the 32 players entering in the second and third rounds to leave the last 64 in the fourth round.

No players are seeded.
A random draw is held for each of the following rounds following the conclusion of the third round.
All matches in the first, second and third rounds will be played over best of 11 legs.
All matches in the fourth, fifth and sixth rounds and quarter-finals will be played over best of 19 legs.
All matches in the semi-finals and final will be played over best of 21 legs.
Eight boards will be used for matches in the first, second, third and fourth rounds.
Four boards will be used for matches in the fifth round.
Two boards will be used for matches in the sixth round.
One board will be used for all the matches in the quarter-finals, semi-finals and final.

Qualifiers

Number 1–32 of the PDC Order of Merit (receiving byes into fourth round)

Number 33–64 of the PDC Order of Merit (receiving byes into third round)

Number 65–96 of the PDC Order of Merit (receiving byes into second round)

Number 97–128 of the PDC Order of Merit (starting in first round)

PDC Challenge Tour qualifiers (starting in first round)
The top 8 ranked players from the 2019 Challenge Tour Order of Merit who didn't have a Tour Card for the 2020 season qualified for the first round.

PDC Development Tour qualifiers (starting in first round)
The top 8 ranked players from the 2019 Development Tour Order of Merit who didn't have a Tour Card for the 2020 season qualified for the first round.

Rileys amateur qualifiers (starting in first round)
16 amateur players will qualify from 16 Rileys Sports Bar qualifiers held across the UK between 25 January and 22 February.

Draw

Friday 6 March

First round (best of eleven legs)

Second round (best of eleven legs)

Third round (best of eleven legs)

Fourth round (best of nineteen legs)

Saturday 7 March

Fifth round (best of nineteen legs)

Sixth round (best of nineteen legs)

Sunday 8 March

Quarter-finals (best of nineteen legs)

Semi-finals and Final

References

UK Open
UK Open
UK Open
UK Open